Copper Breaks State Park is a state park in Hardeman County, Texas, located approximately  south of Quanah, the county seat.

History
Originally, Copper Breaks was part of the land held by the Comanche and Kiowa.  Comanche mound sites can be found in Hardeman County, but not in the park itself.  Purchased from a private landowner in 1970, the state park opened to the public in 1974.

Features

The park has two bodies of water in it, Copper Breaks Lake and Big Pond.

Flora
Copper Breaks is a semi-arid region receiving  of rainfall in an average year, allowing the growth of bunch grasses, and narrow shallow breaks of mesquite, juniper, cottonwood, some scattered native pecan, hackberry, soapberry and a variety of wildflowers.

Fauna
Wildlife observed in the park includes mule deer, rabbits, raccoons, armadillos, opossums, bobcats, porcupines and coyotes. Roadrunners, great blue herons, many species of ducks, meadowlarks, quail, doves, cardinals, owls, flickers, bluebirds, kites, hawks and mockingbirds are just a few of the many species of birds found in the park. Numerous frogs, turtles and lizards can be seen, as well as an occasional horned toad. Lake Copper Breaks is stocked with rainbow trout each winter.

Programs
Copper Breaks is an International Dark Sky Park and hosts a stargazing program once a month from April through October.

Copper Breaks also includes a portion of the official state Texas longhorn herd.

References

External links

 Texas Parks and Wildlife Department page on Copper Breaks
  (used as reference)

State parks of Texas
Protected areas of Hardeman County, Texas
1974 establishments in Texas
Dark-sky preserves in the United States